SS Meteor may refer to:

, a whaleback freighter on the Great Lakes that sailed until 1969; now a museum ship in Superior, Wisconsin
, an ocean liner built for the Hamburg America Line; sunk by aircraft 9 March 1945
One of several Type C2 ships built for the United States Maritime Commission:
 (MC hull number 127, Type C2-T), built by Tampa Shipbuilding; transferred to the United States Navy as Arcturus-class attack cargo ship USS Electra (AKA-4); scrapped in 1974
 (MC hull number 292, Type C2-S-B1), built by Moore Dry Dock; sold for commercial use under the name American Miller in 1948; scrapped in 1970

Ship names